Pachyneurum is a genus of flowering plants belonging to the family Brassicaceae.

Its native range is Xinjiang to Siberia and Mongolia.

Species
Species:
 Pachyneurum grandiflorum (C.A.Mey.) Bunge

References

Brassicaceae
Brassicaceae genera
Taxa named by Alexander von Bunge